Asangaon is a railway station on the Central line of the Mumbai Suburban Railway network. It is also now a green station. It is the only railway station which serves Shahapur city. It is a busy station; around 75 thousand commuters use this station on daily basis. It is the terminal station for Asangaon local train.

Asangaon is situated at the bank of River Bharangi and is in Shahapur Taluka of District Thane. This railway station services the villages of Asangaon, Taluka Headquarters Shahapur and many surrounding villages. People travelling to Mahuli Fort and Manas Mandir, Shahapur, use the Asangaon Railway Station. Besides the Mumbai Suburban (Mumbai CST–Thane–Kalyan–Titwala–Asanagon–Kasara) suburban railway, Asangaon is also serviced by the dual-carriageway National Highway No. 3.

Asangaon used to be a sleepy village along the Mumbai Nashik Highway and the Mumbai–Kasara–Igatpuri–Nashik railway line. It has recently gained a lot of attention because of the 400-odd Non Polluting industries in the Asangaon Industrial Area and Oswal Industrial Estate nearby, many new residential developments, colleges, retail outlets, banks and eateries are opening up.

References

External links

 Affordable Residences Near Mumbai, Times of India, Magicbricks
 Manas Mandir, Shahapur
 Asangaon Industrial Area WikiMapia
 Oswal Industrial Estate Google Maps

Railway stations in Thane district
Mumbai Suburban Railway stations
Mumbai CR railway division
Kalyan-Igatpuri rail line